Since the inception of the Italian football league competition, the Serie A, in 1929, more than 250 players have scored three goals (a hat-trick) or more in a single match. Swedish striker Gunnar Nordahl holds the record for most Serie A hat-tricks, having scored seventeen from 1949 to 1955. He scored all his hat-tricks while representing Milan, making him the player with most hat-tricks for a single club. He is followed by Italian striker Giuseppe Meazza who scored fifteen hat-tricks, all of them with Internazionale. Kurt Hamrin and István Nyers are in third place, with twelve hat-tricks each.

Over fifty players have scored more than three goals in a single match; of these, eleven players, Carlo Galli, Kurt Hamrin, Miroslav Klose, Roberto Pruzzo, Bruno Ispiro, István Mike Mayer, Antonio Valentín Angelillo, Giuseppe Meazza, Cesare Fasanelli, Emanuele Del Vecchio and Giovanni Vecchina have scored five. Silvio Piola and Omar Sívori have scored the most goals in a single match at six goals each. Gunnar Nordahl, Giuseppe Meazza and Kurt Hamrin have scored four or more goals three times in Serie A, more than any other player.

Serie A all-time top goalscorer Silvio Piola holds the record as the youngest player to score a hat-trick (17 years and 132 days), and the youngest to score more than three goals in one match (18 years and 54 days). Rodrigo Palacio is the oldest player to score a hat-trick (39 years and 86 days).

Hat-tricks

Note: The results column shows the goalscorer's team score first

Multiple hat-tricks
The following table lists the minimum number of hat-tricks scored by players who have scored two or more hat-tricks.

Players in bold  are still active in Serie A. Players in italics are still active outside the Serie A.

Notes

References

External links
Serie A website

Hat-tricks
Serie A
Serie A
Association football player non-biographical articles